A Central Index Key or CIK number is a unique number assigned to an individual, company, filing agent or foreign government by the United States Securities and Exchange Commission. The number is used to identify its filings in several online databases, including EDGAR.

The numbers are up to ten digits in length and are permanent identifiers that may not be changed.

See also
 CUSIP
 Legal Entity Identifier

References

External link
 CIK at the SEC's EDGAR website

Security identifier types
Financial regulation
Financial metadata